The 2001 Bank of the West Classic was a tennis tournament played on outdoor hard courts that was part of the Tier II Series of the 2001 WTA Tour. It was the 30th edition of the tournament and took place at the Taube Tennis Center in Stanford, California, United States, from July 23 through July 29, 2001. Third-seeded Kim Clijsters won the singles title and earned $90,000 first-prize money.

Finals

Singles

 Kim Clijsters defeated  Lindsay Davenport, 6–4, 6–7(5–7), 6–1
It was Clijsters's 1st singles title of the year, and the 4th of her career.

Doubles

 Janet Lee /  Wynne Prakusya defeated  Nicole Arendt /  Caroline Vis, 3–6, 6–3, 6–3

References

External links
 ITF tournament edition details
 Tournament draws

Bank of the West Classic
Silicon Valley Classic
Bank of the West Classic
Bank of the West Classic
Bank of the West Classic